The Dirty Picture is a 2011 Indian biographical drama film directed by Milan Luthria and produced by Shobha and Ekta Kapoor. Inspired by the lives of such actresses as Silk Smitha and Disco Shanti, the film narrates the rise and fall of a dancing girl in Tamil cinema. The Dirty Picture features Vidya Balan in the lead role, and co-stars Emraan Hashmi, Tusshar Kapoor and Naseeruddin Shah. Rajat Arora wrote the screenplay, dialogues and lyrics for the film and Vishal–Shekhar composed the music.

The film garnered awards and nominations in several categories, with particular praise for Vidya's performance, the dialogues, and the costume design by Niharika Khan. As of 2012, the film has won 51 awards.

The Dirty Picture won three National Film Awards, including Best Actress (Vidya) and Best Costume Design (Khan). At the 57th Filmfare Awards ceremony, the film won three awards, including Best Actress and Best Costume Design. It also received nominations for Best Film and Best Director (Luthria) at the ceremony. The film also won six Screen Awards, more than any film that year, including Best Film, Best Director and Best Actress. Among other wins, the film received two Apsara Awards, and five awards each from the Zee Cine and International Indian Film Academy Awards ceremonies, all of which included Best Actress awards for Vidya.

Accolades

See also
 List of Bollywood films of 2011

Footnotes

References

External links
Accolades for The Dirty Picture at the Internet Movie Database

Lists of accolades by Indian film